The 2011 edition of the Canadian Polaris Music Prize was presented on September 19, 2011 The winner was Arcade Fire, for the album The Suburbs.

For the 2011 award, the prize was increased to $30,000 for the winning musician.

Shortlist
The prize's 10-album shortlist was announced on July 6.

Longlist
The prize's preliminary 40-album longlist was announced on June 16.

References

External links
 Polaris Music Prize

2011 in Canadian music
2011 music awards
2011